Lisa Otondo is a former state senator from Arizona, who represented the 4th district. She served on three committees: Appropriations; Transportation and Technology; and Natural Resources, Energy and Water (Ranking Member). A member of the Democratic Party, Otondo was first elected to the Arizona House of Representatives in 2012. She served on the Education Committee and the Technology and Infrastructure Committee.

Elections
 In 2014, Otondo successfully ran alongside the now Arizona House Democratic Leader Charlene Fernandez.
 In 2012, Otondo and Juan Carlos "J.C." Escamilla were unopposed in the general election. Otondo came first in the Democratic primary winning 4,238 votes.

References

External links
 Profile at the Arizona Senate
 Vote Smart page

Living people
People from Yuma, Arizona
Middlebury College alumni
Women state legislators in Arizona
Democratic Party members of the Arizona House of Representatives
21st-century American politicians
21st-century American women politicians
Year of birth missing (living people)
Democratic Party Arizona state senators